West Taylor Township is a township in Cambria County, Pennsylvania, United States. The population was 795 at the 2010 census. It is part of the Johnstown, Pennsylvania Metropolitan Statistical Area.

Geography
West Taylor Township is located in southwestern Cambria County and is bordered to the south by the city of Johnstown.  The Conemaugh River forms the southwestern border of the township as it flows through the Conemaugh Gorge, a  canyon carved through the  ridge of Laurel Hill.

Demographics

As of the census of 2000, there were 862 people, 364 households, and 252 families residing in the township.  The population density was 146.9 people per square mile (56.7/km2).  There were 392 housing units at an average density of 66.8/sq mi (25.8/km2).  The racial makeup of the township was 96.17% White, 3.13% African American, 0.23% Native American, and 0.46% from two or more races. Hispanic or Latino of any race were 1.51% of the population.

There were 364 households, out of which 23.9% had children under the age of 18 living with them, 55.5% were married couples living together, 9.9% had a female householder with no husband present, and 30.5% were non-families. 27.7% of all households were made up of individuals, and 16.5% had someone living alone who was 65 years of age or older.  The average household size was 2.29 and the average family size was 2.78.

In the township the population was spread out, with 17.2% under the age of 18, 6.1% from 18 to 24, 27.4% from 25 to 44, 29.4% from 45 to 64, and 20.0% who were 65 years of age or older.  The median age was 44 years. For every 100 females there were 102.3 males.  For every 100 females age 18 and over, there were 101.7 males.

The median income for a household in the township was $25,046, and the median income for a family was $29,083. Males had a median income of $27,102 versus $20,417 for females. The per capita income for the township was $14,396.  About 11.7% of families and 14.2% of the population were below the poverty line, including 20.9% of those under age 18 and 11.5% of those age 65 or over.

References

Populated places established in 1884
Townships in Cambria County, Pennsylvania